Donni Leaycraft (born July 18, 1968) is a former professional tennis player from the United States.

Career
Leaycraft, who was a member of the USTA Junior Davis Cup team, won the NCAA Singles Championship in 1989. He was the first player from the LSU Tigers to have won the title and defeated Steven Jung of Nebraska in the final.

In 1989 he also competed in the main draw of the US Open. He lost in the first round to 12th seed Emilio Sánchez, in four sets.

References

1968 births
Living people
American male tennis players
LSU Tigers tennis players
People from Metairie, Louisiana
Tennis people from Louisiana